Andrew Given Tobias Moore II (November 25, 1935 – December 10, 2018) was an American attorney who was a justice of the Delaware Supreme Court from 1982 to 1994.  He died on December 10, 2018.

Moore received a Bachelor of Arts from Tulane University in 1958, and a Juris Doctor from Tulane University School of Law in 1960. He was appointed to the high court of Delaware by Governor Pierre S. du Pont IV. After completing his term on the court and working at an investment bank, he became an attorney with Gibbons, P.C.

References

External links
Biography of Andrew G. T. Moore II from Gibbons, P.C.

1935 births
2018 deaths
Tulane University alumni
Tulane University Law School alumni
Justices of the Delaware Supreme Court
20th-century American judges